András István Arató (born 11 July 1945) is a Hungarian retired electrical engineer and model. In 2011, he became the subject of the Internet meme Hide the Pain Harold due to his overall facial expression and seemingly fake smile. Arató has been in and out of the stock photo and advertisement industry as a model since disclosing his identity. He took up travelling to foreign countries such as Turkey and Russia for recreational purposes and kept a blog about his life and travels. The photos associated with such travels are said to be the cause of Arató's fame. While vacationing in Turkey, Arató decided to upload personal vacation photos onto social media site iWiW, which were noticed by a photographer.

Personal life
Born in 1945 in Kőszeg, András Arató was raised in the era of the Iron Curtain. He has stated that a major part of his childhood was a gargantuan chestnut tree growing in his hometown. He would reminisce about it as if it were a tree of wisdom in his town as many do of landmarks in their own lives. Not much else is currently known about Arató's teenage and pre-university years. In 1969, Arató graduated from the Budapest University of Technology and Economics under the Faculty of Electrical Engineering. After retirement, he worked as a DJ for a local radio station for five years. In 2019, he became the advertising face for Coca-Cola in Hungary. In 2020, Arató starred in the Hungarian edition of Masked Singer (known in Hungary as Álarcos énekes), broadcast on the TV station RTL Klub. Arató lives in Budapest with his wife Gabriella and his son.

Hide the Pain Harold 

While Arató was on holiday, he was taking photos of his trip, uploading them to social media. Not only his friends saw his photos, but also a professional photographer, who contacted him saying that he was seeking a model and offered him an invitation to a shoot. Arató accepted the offer and the photographer took some photos, which both he and Arató liked. He was invited for more shoots and over a hundred stock photos were made. He agreed for the photos to be used for this purpose, with the exception of photos of topics about politics, religion, and sex, as he felt those topics are sensitive to many people.

Arató later looked himself up on Google Images and saw photos of himself as a doctor, coming from a hospital's homepage. A few months after, he looked himself up again and discovered more photos, including one of his face pasted on all four faces of Mount Rushmore. These were the early stages of an Internet meme. The photographer who took the stock photos had asked him to smile, and many internet users perceived his smile as fake, masking sorrow, ultimately giving him the name "Hide the Pain Harold". Arató stated that during the photoshoot he became tired of smiling too much.

At first, Arató was unhappy about people adding funny text to his photos, stating he was not really a "funny guy". Arató realised he did similar things while he was in school, like drawing on pictures in his course books of the Hungarian poet John Arany, making him look like a pirate. He stated that closing down a webpage would not really work, as the meme content could soon respawn, so after six years, he accepted his meme status. He hoped that everyone would forget about using his photos, but that did not happen. First, Internet users from the United States started posting photos of Arató, then the practice spread to Europe, and later on, the rest of the world.

An Internet user found out Arató's true identity and emailed him, stating that there were many users who believed that he was not a real living person. At first, Arató ignored the user's request, but after getting more emails with the same request, he agreed to upload a picture of himself on his Russian fanpage, holding a sign saying "Я ЖИВ" ("YA ZHIV", Russian for "I'M ALIVE"). After a few hours, the photo had been seen by over ten thousand users as well as the international media.

Works 
 On 13 May 1999, he published his report on Lighting Technology.
 Lighting lexicon / [ed. András Arató et al.] ; [intermediate a] Lighting Company. Budapest, 2001. 136 p.
 For operators of interior lighting : : addition to the publication "Lighting Technology" / [... it's all set up. John the Great] ; [... interede. András Arató et al.] ; [ed. EGI Energy Management Limited Company]. Budapest : EGI, 2001. 46 p. or 46 p.
 He co-authored the Street Lighting Manual. Spend. MEE Lighting Society, Foundation for Hungarian Lighting Technology, 2009. 310 p. or partly colored.

Awards 
 In 2002, Arató won the János Urbanek Prize. The Hungarian Electrotechnical Association (MEE, short for the Hungarian Magyar Elektrotechnikai Egyesület) awards the János Urbanek Prize yearly, which is given to a member who, within the framework of the Association life, has an outstanding theoretical or practical activity in the field of lighting technology.
 In 2010, he won the Déri Miksa Award from the MEE.

See also 
 Heartbreaking: The Worst Person You Know Just Made A Great Point
 List of Internet phenomena
 List of Hungarians

References

External links 
 
 
 András Arató's Travel Blog
 Hide the Pain Harold Official Webpage

 VTT winners: Pollich Prize (for Lighting Society)

Living people
1945 births
Hungarian electrical engineers
Internet memes
People notable for being the subject of a specific photograph
Hungarian models
Hungarian engineers
Hungarian photographers
People from Kőszeg
Male models
Budapest University of Technology and Economics alumni
Stock photography